Roma is a fictional character appearing in American comic books published by Marvel Comics. She is the daughter of Merlyn. Roma is the Omniversal Guardian, charged with the safety of the Omniverse. She is assisted in her task by Saturnyne (the Omniversal Majestrix), and the Captain Britain Corps.

Publication history
Roma first appeared in Marvel UK's Captain Britain, in the first issue in Oct. 1976, and subsequently appeared in the second volume of Captain Britain's series. The second volume was reprinted in the U.S. in the Captain Britain trade paperback.

In 1978, Chris Claremont introduced Captain Britain to an international audience, fully integrating him into the Marvel Universe via a story that starred Captain Britain and Spider-Man, with Roma in a small role. Initially published as a black & white story in the UK's Super Spider-Man & Captain Britain comic, this was then coloured and reprinted in an American title, Marvel's long-running Marvel Team-Up series, issue #65.

Fictional character biography

Captain Britain
Captain Britain, then still a baseline human, was working as a research assistant at the Darkmoor Research Centre when the nuclear complex was suddenly attacked by a man named Joshua Stragg (the Reaver). In his efforts to escape, Brian was chased over a cliff. Roma, then calling herself "the Lady of the Northern Skies," appeared to him and offered him the chance to become a hero. Her father, Merlyn, was with her during this first encounter with Brian. Roma urged him to choose between two weapons, the Sword of Might, or the Amulet of Right; Roma's decision to offer him salvation and power rode on this choice. Brian subsequently made the correct choice, choosing the Amulet.

Roma and her father exist in another dimension called Otherworld, operating out of Roma's Starlight Citadel. Captain Britain, or more specifically, his spirit, met them in this dimension after a battle with a villain named Lord Hawk that left him in a coma.

Aside from endowing Captain Britain with great physical strength, Roma also originally gave him a quarterstaff, a weapon that could be used for direct attack or emit a protective force field. Merlyn eventually replaced the staff with Captain Britain's Star Scepter.

Roma would eventually replace her father as the Omniversal Guardian and ruler of Otherworld, thinking her father had died. In fact, Merlyn had faked his death so he could manipulate future events while being safe from his enemies. As the successor to the seemingly deceased Merlyn, she observed Captain Britain from Otherplace. She later brought Captain UK to an alternate Earth and reunited her with her husband.

X-Men/Siege Perilous
Roma appeared in human form while reaching out to a recovering and disillusioned Colossus shortly after "Mutant Massacre" and before "Inferno." Colossus had just healed from his injuries inflicted on him by the Marauders when the X-Men were fighting to rescue the Morlocks. Roma approached him and asked him to draw a sketch of her; she offered to pay him by telling him his fortune. When he finished his sketch, she hinted at things that would happen in the X-Men's future, but remained vague enough to anger him. She disappeared from the scene, leaving behind a figurine of him in his armored (steel) form.

During this encounter, Roma was really being held captive in her Starlight Citadel by the Trickster (aka the Adversary), a deity who planned on destroying the earth to remake it into whatever image he chose. The X-Men defeated the Adversary, freeing Roma and forcing the Adversary into a portal. Using Forge's spell, it took harnessing the souls of all eight active X-Men and Madelyne Pryor, who was there at the time, to create and shut the portal. Roma repaid them by retrieving their souls from the portal, which had a side effect of making them undetectable to electronic equipment and cameras, effectively making them "invisible" to their enemies.

Roma also bequeathed the X-Men with and made them the guardians of a mystical portal called the Siege Perilous. This portal is a gem that enlarges into a doorway. Individuals walk through the portal to have their lives and deeds judged on a cosmic scale, eventually being reborn if they are deemed worthy. X-Men who have traveled through the Siege Perilous include Rogue (accidentally sucked into it while battling the Master Mold/Nimrod), Havok, Psylocke, Dazzler, and Colossus.

Excalibur
One of the X-Men who sacrificed herself was Psylocke, Captain Britain's sister. The grief over his sister's death united Captain Britain and his girlfriend Meggan with the surviving X-Men Shadowcat and Nightcrawler. Together they saved Rachel Summers, host to the Phoenix Force, and formed Excalibur. To keep the individualistic Captain Britain a part of Excalibur, Roma put a jinx on him. Whenever he tried to act independently of the team, he would make mistakes and fail. Roma had foreseen that Excalibur would become essential to the safety of the Omniverse; only a group with their specific talents could stop an unknown threat. Roma later warned Galactus not to slay Phoenix.

Roma eventually discovered that Merlyn was still alive. Merlyn, in disguise, manipulated Captain Britain into confronting Roma and she removed the jinx and told him about the secret threat. Excalibur encountered the threat shortly afterwards: Necrom, Merlyn's teacher had been planning for millennia to use the Phoenix Force to increase his own power. Roma persuaded Excalibur to destroy Merlyn's tower in the multiversal energy matrix, but prevented Merlyn from killing Excalibur. The combined powers of Excalibur defeated Necrom as Merlyn had planned. Roma told Excalibur that from now on, they would be free to determine their own destiny.

Roma was captured and impersonated by the villain Mastermind, who planned on using the Sword of Might and the Amulet of Right to reshape the Omniverse. Mastermind was defeated by Captain Britain and his friends and Roma gave the throne of Otherworld to Captain Britain, who now wielded both the Sword and the Amulet. Roma would retain her function as Omniversal Guardian though.

Fantastic Four/Franklin Richards
Roma briefly appeared in Fantastic Four, when she sent Gatecrasher to kidnap Franklin Richards, thinking he was too powerful to stay on Earth and with his family. Johnny Storm was later able to convince her otherwise.

She again appeared when Abraxas was trying to find the Ultimate Nullifier. She summoned Valeria Richards and Franklin Richards to protect them from Abraxas but was unsuccessful, since she was murdered in the process. But Franklin revealed that Roma had taught him for an unknown period of time and that Valeria and himself would be needed in resurrecting Galactus. They used up all their powers to resurrect Galactus and ended the threat of Abraxas. Roma, who was killed, was ultimately resurrected in the process.

House of M
Roma, after sending Captain Britain to Earth-616, briefly appears to Captain Britain in a dream, telling him that he only has 48 hours to save Earth-616, which Saturnyne states has become a "causality cancer."

X-Men: Die by the Sword

Mad Jim Jaspers and Fury return to attack the Starlight Citadel in a plan orchestrated by Roma's father Merlyn. During the battle, Roma is mortally wounded and gives all her knowledge to Sage before Merlyn removes the same knowledge and kills her.

Incursions
Lady Roma has since been revealed to have been restored to life. She is seen along with Saturnyne expressing their concerns about the Incursions that are destroying many dimensions when they are interrupted by Spider-UK who reveals that all the spiders across the multiverse are being hunted and killed. Saturnyne rebuffs him rude and coldly, but Roma sympathizes with him and gives him a talisman that allows him to travel through the web of life in order to save all the remaining spiders.

The Floating Kingdom
Following the rebirth of all existence after the Incursion crisis, Roma lost her position as the Omniversal Majestrix and ruler of Otherworld to Saturnyne and split apart from her father, Merlyn. This is the result of a deal she made with Saturnyne in the future Otherworld province Blightspoke, after Otherworld was destroyed by Mapmakers. They agreed that she would rebuild Otherworld with the Mapmakers power and become Omniversal Magestrix in exchange for making the Fair Courts for her to rule and the Foul Courts for her father to rule, allowing her to finally achieve power outside her fathers control. She created the Floating Kingdom of Roma Regina, which become one of the provinces of the Fair Courts in Otherworld, but due to her desire for freedom and lawlessness, her queendom has become a chaotic (but gentle) hedonism ranging from candylands, ruckus dance halls, neon playrooms, and lusty pleasure zones.

As shown in an arc in New Mutants, she and her father are no longer on speaking terms. When her father unites most of the nations together in a invasion of the Starlight Citadel that forces Saturnyne and her allies into hiding, The Floating Kingdom of Roma Regina becomes one of the only parts of Otherworld not under his control, it becomes a refuge for mutants who are being hunted down by Furies. Roma brings together 10 specific mutants to help stop her father, declaring them the "Knights of X" and sends them on a mission to find the Siege Perilous. She also agrees to help Jubilee's son Shogo control the powers he has in Otherworld. For his first lesson, she and Saturnyne forced him to watch Gambit seemingly being killed in battle with King Arthur in their scrying pool to teach him a lesson about sacrifice. She and Saturnyne later flew Shogo to Mercator where they converged with the Knights of X, as well as Arthur and Merlyn's forces.

Powers and abilities
Roma is the youngest member of the extra-dimensional race of Otherworld, but still millennia old and immortal. She has been highly trained in the mystical arts, with an extensive knowledge of sorcery rivaling that of her father Merlyn. She has extraordinary prowess in manipulating the vast magical powers at her disposal, which she can use in countless ways, including interdimensional teleportation, astral projection, healing, mind-reading, energy manipulation and many more. As the Omniversal Guardian she also has access to the technology and power of Otherworld, which has devices capable of destroying complete universes. The Captain Britain Corps obeys her commands.

Footnotes

External links
http://www.marvel.com/universe/Roma
Roma's Profile at Women of Marvel Comics
 

Characters created by Alan Davis
Characters created by Chris Claremont
Characters created by Herb Trimpe
Comics characters introduced in 1976
Fictional characters from parallel universes
Fictional characters with immortality
Marvel Comics characters who use magic
Marvel UK characters
Marvel Comics female superheroes